

NVC community M1 (Sphagnum auriculatum bog pool community) is one of the mire communities in the British National Vegetation Classification system.

It is a fairly widespread community in western Britain, but absent from the east. There are no subcommunities.

Community composition

The following constant species are found in this community:
 Common Cottongrass Eriophorum angustifolium
 Bogbean Menyanthes trifoliata
 Cow-horn Bog-moss Sphagnum auriculatum
 Feathery Bog-moss Sphagnum cuspidatum

Five rare species are associated with the community:
 Bog Orchid Hammarbya paludosa
 Brown Beak-sedge Rhynchospora fusca
 Rannoch-rush Scheuchzeria palustris
 Intermediate Bladderwort Utricularia intermedia
 Golden Bog-moss Sphagnum pulchrum

Distribution

This community has its main concentration in northwest Scotland, including the Outer Hebrides, Inner Hebrides, Caithness and Argyll. It is also found in southwest Scotland, Cumbria, central Wales, the New Forest, and in the Southwest peninsula.

References

 Rodwell, J. S. (1991) British Plant Communities Volume 2 - Mires and heaths  (hardback),  (paperback)

M01